Senapati (Meitei pronunciation:/se.na.pə.ti/) is of the 16 districts of Manipur state in India.

Geography
Senapati District is located between 93.29° and 94.15° East Longitude and 24.37° and 25.37° North Latitude and is in the northern part of Manipur state. The District is bounded on the south by Kangpokpi District, on the east by Ukhrul district, on the west by Tamenglong district and on the north by Kohima District and Phek district of Nagaland state. The district lies at an altitude between 1061 meter to 1788 meters above sea level.

Demographics

According to the 2011 census Senapati district has a population of 479,148, roughly equal to the nation of Belize. This gives it a ranking of 565th in India (out of a total of 640). Its population growth rate over the decade 2001-2011 was 25.16%. Senapati has a sex ratio of 939 females for every 1000 males, and a literacy rate of 75%. Bifurcated Senapati district had a population of 285,404 after bifurcation. Scheduled Castes and Scheduled Tribes make up 0.10% and 92.74% of the population respectively.

Languages

More than 95% of the population speak various Naga languages.

Villages
 

 Maphou
 Phuba Thapham

See also
 List of populated places in Senapati district
 Maphou

Notes

References

External links
 Official district government site

 
Districts of Manipur
Minority Concentrated Districts in India
1969 establishments in Manipur